Dan Rivers is US correspondent at ITV News, and a former correspondent at CNN and CNN International.

Education
Rivers was educated at Beechen Cliff School, a boys' state comprehensive school in the city of Bath in Somerset in South West England, followed by University College at Durham University where he studied social science, and Falmouth College of Arts, where he obtained a post-graduate diploma in broadcast journalism.

Career
He started in BBC local radio in south-west Britain, in Cornwall and Devon. After a stint as a producer at BBC Radio Five Live, he worked at Euronews in Lyon for a year in 2000. In 2001 he joined ITV News later being promoted to Crime Correspondent.

He reported on Cyclone Nargis in Burma.

In 2010 Rivers joined CNN International as a senior international correspondent mainly covering South-East Asia from Bangkok.

He rejoined ITV News in 2013 as their Wales and West of England correspondent.

He was soon moved to cover predominantly international news based in London in 2014. He has covered a variety of international stories including the earthquakes in Nepal in 2015  and on-going assignments to Syria and the Middle East.

In 2022 Rivers covered the war in Ukraine extensively. He was the first journalist to report from Kharkiv on the same day missiles hit the main administrative building in the city. He filed reports from the frontlines in the Donbass and Kyiv, as well as special reports detailing Russian war crimes.

In 2023 Rivers was appointed US Correspondent for ITV News, covering north America for ITV's main bulletins.

Awards and nominations
 Shortlisted Royal Television Society Specialist journalism 2006 
 Winner - 2009 George Polk Awards, for International Television Reporting  
 Winner Cine Eagle Award 2009
 Winner Amnesty International Media Award 2009 - A forgotten People
 Nominated - News & Documentary Emmy Award for Outstanding Continuing Coverage of a News Story in a Regularly Scheduled Newscast
 Nominated for Royal Television Specialist of the year 2020  for coverage of the migrant crisis.
 Nominated Royal Television Society Specialist journalist of the year 2023 for Ukraine War Crimes coverage

Personal life 
Dan Rivers is the only child of Dr. John Rivers, an eminent nutritionist who worked at the London School of Hygiene and Tropical Medicine carrying out pioneering work on famine relief in Ethiopia. His mother is a retired biochemist. Dan is married to Australian journalist Selina Downes.

References

External links

Alumni of University College, Durham
Alumni of Falmouth University
British television journalists
CNN people
George Polk Award recipients
ITN newsreaders and journalists
Living people
People educated at Beechen Cliff School
Year of birth missing (living people)